The USS Pinola (ATA-206) was a Sotoyomo-class auxiliary fleet tug launched in 1945 and serving until 1956. The ship was transferred to the Republic of Korea in 1962.

Construction
The ship was planned and authorized as Rescue Ocean Tug ATR-133 but redesignated "Auxiliary Fleet Tug ATA-206" on 15 May 1944. The hull was laid down by the Gulfport Shipbuilding Corporation, Port Arthur, Texas 26 October 1944; launched 14 December 1944; and commissioned as ATA-206 10 February 1945.

History

Service as ATA-206
ATA-206 completed shakedown 10 March 1945, then steamed to Gulfport, Mississippi to pick up YF-754 for towing to San Diego. Thence she proceeded to Hawaii and departed Pearl Harbor 11 May towing AED-21 to Guam. She sailed from Apra Harbor 5 July to operate from Chimu Wan Harbor, Okinawa, where she arrived with a dump scow and another barge in tow the 15th. Towing and salvage operations in the vicinity of Buckner Bay kept her busy for the remainder of the war. On 22 July she salvaged an Army dredge off a coral reef in Buckner Bay and later refloated a gasoline tanker aground on a coral reef in Chimu Wan Harbor.

She sailed for Subic Bay in the Philippines 30 January 1946, and picked up a lend-lease dredge for towing to Melbourne, Australia. On 20 February, while being towed, that dredge sank of an unknown cause and the tug returned to San Pedro Bay in Leyte Gulf. Here she took YD-121 in tow for a long voyage past the Marianas and Marshall Islands to Pearl Harbor.

Recommissioned as Pianola
She returned to San Diego and decommissioned 4 October 1946. She was named Pinola 16 June 1948.

Pinola recommissioned 10 January 1949 and was assigned to Service Squadron 1, U.S. Pacific Fleet, to serve primarily towing target sleds for surface gunnery exercises for the Fleet Training Group based at San Diego, Calif. This service was interrupted by a cruise to Sasebo, Japan for operations in Service Squadron 3, 2 August 1954 – 27 March 1955.

Transfer to Korea
The Pinola was decommissioned on 6 April 1956 and was transferred to the Republic of Korea on 2 February 1962 under the Military Assistance Program, and served into the 1970s as ROKS Do Bong (ATA-3). Her ultimate fate is unknown.

References

External links

 

1944 ships
Ships built in Port Arthur, Texas
Sotoyomo-class tugs